Ashok Som is a professor and author. He is a professor at the Management Department of ESSEC Business School, France-Singapore. He is currently researching the Luxury Sector. He was the founding Associate Dean of the Global MBA Program at ESSEC Business School. He has also founded the Indian Research Center, which researches Indian and Asian businesses and their significant effects on the French and European Markets.

He was also the coordinator of the Global executive program in Luxury and Retail Management at the Indian Institute of Management Ahmedabad, which has partnered with the ESSEC Business School of Paris and Singapore. He has also authored books about the Luxury sector, global strategy and Organizational Re-Design.

Books
 Organization Re-design and Innovative HRM (Oxford University Press, 2008) This was the first book written by Ashok Som, which dealt with organizational redesign including Human Resource Management strategies. Five large firms, namely, Lafarge (company), Renault-Nissan, Maruti Suzuki, Mahut Group and Bharat Petroleum have been analysed in this book. According to WorldCat, the book is in 121 libraries.
International Management: Managing the Global Corporation (McGraw Hill, 2009). This book consists of expert discussions that can be used for in-depth analysis of large conglomerates such as Alstom, AF-KLM, Arcelor-Mittal, Canal +, Carrefour, Lafarge (company), LVMH, L’Oreal, Renault and Vodafone
The Road to Luxury: The Evolution, Markets and Strategies of Luxury Brand Management (John Wiley & Sons, 2015). This book gives in-depth analysis of the Luxury sector.

References

External links 

Academic staff of the Indian Institute of Management Ahmedabad
Living people
Year of birth missing (living people)